Talay is a surname that is particularly common in Turkey. It is also used as a masculine given name. People with the name include:

Surname
 Alina Talay (born 1989), Belarusian track and field athlete
 Ayshe Talay-Ongan (born 1947), Turkish-born Australian author
 İstemihan Talay (born 1945), Turkish politician 
 Türkiz Talay (born 1974), Turkish-German actress
 Ufuk Talay (born 1976), Australian football (soccer) player

Given name
 Talay Riley, British musician
 Talay Sanguandikul (born 1995), Thai actor

See also
 

Turkish-language surnames
Thai masculine given names